ESL One New York 2016  was a Counter-Strike: Global Offensive tournament run by ESL. Eight teams from around the globe competed in an offline (LAN) tournament that will feature a group stage and a playoffs. It featured a 250,000 prize pool.

Format
ESL invited six teams to compete in ESL One New York. One team from the European Qualifier and one team from the North American Qualifier will also have a ticket to the tournament. Both qualifiers are played online.

The group stage played in a best-of-one Swiss-system tournament format consisting of 5 rounds, much like the ESL One Cologne 2016 Qualifier. In the end, the top four teams will advance to the Playoffs.

The Playoffs were formatted in a four team, best-of-three, single elimination bracket.

Broadcast Talent
Stage Hosts
 Paul "ReDeYe" Chaloner
 Alex "Machine" Richardson
Analysts
 Janko "YNk" Paunović
 Duncan "Thorin" Shields
Commentators
 Anders Blume
 Chad "SPUNJ" Burchill
 Hugo Byron
 Henry "HenryG" Greer
 Mitch "Uber" Leslie
 Joona "natu" Leppänen
 John "BLU" Mullen
 Jason "moses" O'Toole
 Matthew "Sadokist" Trivett
Observers
 DJ "Prius" Kuntz
 Alex "Rushly" Rush
 Kevin "kVIN_S" Swift

Qualifiers
In each qualifier, one team will move on to the main tournament.

Europe Qualifier

North America Qualifier

Teams Competing

Group stage

Playoffs

Semifinals Scores

Finals Scores

Final standings

References

2016 in esports
2016 in sports in New York City
ESL One Counter-Strike competitions